is a  mountain in the Chūgoku Mountains, located on the border of Taka and Kamikawa, Hyōgo, Japan. This mountain is one of Hyōgo 50 mountains. This mountain is an important center of Kasagatayama-Sengamine Prefectural Natural Park.

Outline 
Mount Kasagata is a typical fault-block mountain in this area. The name comes from the fact that the shape of the mountain is like an umbrella ('Kasa' in Japanese)..

Route 

There are three major routes to the top of this mountain. The most popular route is from Seka, Ichikawa. It takes one hour. Another route is from Mitani route and Iwazashin route start from Kadokura Bus Stop of Shinki Bus. It takes about two and half hours. The other routes are from Ōya, Taka and Miyono, Kamikawa.,

Access 
 Ōya Bus Stop of Shinki Bus
 Yamato Bus Stop of Shinnki Bus

Gallery

References
 Shinpan Furusato Hyogo 50 san
 Official Home Page of the Geographical Survey Institute in Japan

Kasagata